Jozo Brkić (born 19 July 1986 in Mostar, SFR Yugoslavia) is a professional Bosnian-Herzegovinian basketball player. Brkić started his career with HKK Široki from Bosnia and Herzegovina.

References 

1986 births
Living people
Croats of Bosnia and Herzegovina
Bosnia and Herzegovina men's basketball players
KK Zadar players
HKK Široki players
KB Peja players
Centers (basketball)
Traiskirchen Lions players